Lashio University is a public liberal arts university located in Lashio, Myanmar. Formerly an affiliate of Mandalay University. The university offers bachelor's degree programs in common liberal arts, sciences and law disciplines.

History
Lashio University was first established as Shan State Regional College (Lashio) on 19 January 1978 by the joint efforts of state and the local people. On 1 April 1980, it was transferred by the Ministry of Education and re-established and affiliated with Mandalay University.On 7 July 1999, it was promoted as the Lashio Degree College and it became Lashio University on 20 January 2007.

Departments
Burmese
English
Geography
History
Philosophy
Oriental Studies
Chemistry
Physics
Mathematics
Zoology
Botany
Geology

Administration
The current head of the university is Dr Kyaw Tun, the rector.

Regional College
Saw Aung (Headmaster) (19.1.1978 to 31.3.1980)

College
Saw Aung (Headmaster) (1.4.1980 to 7.2.1982)
Dr Hla Myint (Headmaster) (8.2.1982 to 14.5.1992)
Htay Aung (Headmaster) (15.5.1992 to 24.8.1992)

Saw Aung (Headmaster) (25.8.1992 to 22.7.1997)

Degree College
Myo Tint Swe (Headmaster) (23.7.1997 to 8.1.2002)
Thar Oo (Headmaster) (8.1.2002 to 31.10.2002)
Phay Thaung (Headmaster) (1.11.2002 to 19.1.2007)

University
Phay Thaung (Pro Rector) (20.1.2007 to 31.3.2007)
Dr Khin Maung Oo (Pro Rector) (1.4.2007 to 27.1.2009)
Dr Htay Aung Win(Pro Rector) (27.1.2009 to 7.2.2011)
Dr Thein Win (Acting Pro Rector) (8.2.2011 to 15.2.2011)
Dr Maung Maung (Pro Rector) (16.2.2011 to 31.7.2014)
Dr Maung Maung (Rector) (1.8.2014 to 10.11.2015)
Dr Tun Hlaing (Pro Rector) (11.11.2015 to 18.3.2016)
Dr Maung Maung Naing (Rector) (19.3.2016 to 3.11.2016)
Dr Yaw Han Tun (Pro Rector) (11.11.2017 to 3.12.2017)
Dr Kyaw Tun (Rector) (4.12.2017 - )

References

Universities and colleges in Shan State
Arts and Science universities in Myanmar
Universities and colleges in Myanmar
Educational institutions established in 1978